This is a list of foreign football players in Ukrainian Vyscha Liha/Premier-Liha.

There is a total of 695 foreign players in Vyscha Liha/Premier-Liha of 60 different nationalities of which 370 have been capped at least once for their national team.

In bold: players who have played at least one Ukrainian Premier League game in the current season (2021–22), and are still at a club for which they have played. This does not include current players of a Ukrainian Premier League club who have not played a Ukrainian Premier League game in the current season.

Albania  

 Ansi Agolli – Kryvbas Kryvyi Rih – 2009–10
 Elis Bakaj – Chornomorets Odesa – 2011–14
 Elvin Beqiri – Metalurh Donetsk – 2003–07
 Ervin Bulku – Kryvbas Kryvyi Rih – 2007–10
 Dorian Bylykbashi – Kryvbas Kryvyi Rih – 2006–10
 Debatik Curri – Vorskla Poltava, Hoverla Uzhhorod, Sevastopol – 2004–10, 2013–14
 Armend Dallku – Vorskla Poltava – 2005–16
 Rubin Hebaj – Vorskla Poltava – 2019–20
 Isli Hidi – Kryvbas Kryvyi Rih – 2007–10
 Ahmed Januzi – Vorskla Poltava – 2006–15
 Uliks Kotrri – Tavriya Simferopol – 2003–04
 Ervis Kraja – Zakarpattia Uzhhorod – 2007–08
 Henri Ndreka – Kryvbas Kryvyi Rih – 2006–08
 Tefik Osmani – Metalurh Zaporizhzhia – 2005–06
 Bledi Shkëmbi – Metalurh Zaporizhzhia, Kryvbas Kryvyi Rih – 2004–07
 Kristi Vangjeli – Chornomorets Odesa – 2011–14
 Parid Xhihani – Zorya Luhansk – 2008–11

Algeria  
 Adel Gafaiti – Zirka Kropyvnytskyi – 2017–18

Argentina  
 Walter Acevedo – Metalist Kharkiv
 Fabricio Alvarenga – Olimpik Donetsk, Rukh Lviv – 2020– 
 Sebastián Blanco – Metalist Kharkiv
 Gustavo Blanco Leschuk – Karpaty Lviv, Shakhtar Donetsk – 2016–18
 Facundo Bertoglio – Dynamo Kyiv
 Guido Corteggiano – Karpaty Lviv – 2017–18
 Jonatan Cristaldo – Metalist Kharkiv – 2011–13
 Francisco Di Franco – Karpaty Lviv, Dnipro-1 – 2017–
 Facundo Ferreyra – Shakhtar Donetsk
 Osmar Ferreyra – Dnipro Dnipropetrovsk
 Hernán Fredes – Metalist Kharkiv
 Carlos Frontini – Vorskla Poltava
 Damián Giménez – Chornomorets Odesa
 Alejandro Gómez – Metalist Kharkiv – 2013–14
 Rubén Gómez – Metalurh Donetsk, Stal Alchevsk, Zorya Luhansk, Zakarpattia Uzhhorod, Tavriya Simferopol – 2004–07, 2008–10, 2012–14 
 Jonathan Maidana – Metalist Kharkiv
 Roberto Nanni – Dynamo Kyiv – 2004–05
 Cristian Paz – Karpaty Lviv
 Federico Pereyra – Zirka Kropyvnytskyi, Karpaty Lviv – 2016–17
 Marco Ruben – Dynamo Kyiv – 2012–13
 José Sosa – Metalist Kharkiv – 2011–13
 Claudio Spinelli – Oleksandriya – 2021–
 Fernando Tissone – Karpaty Lviv – 2017–18
 Marco Torsiglieri – Metalist Kharkiv – 2011–13, 2014
 Cristian Villagra – Metalist Kharkiv
 Pablo Vitti – Chornomorets Odesa

Armenia 

 Ararat Arakelyan – Metalurh Donetsk
 Samvel Arakelyan – Metalist Kharkiv
 Artak Dashyan – Metalurh Donetsk – 2009–11
 Hovhannes Demirchyan – Stal Alchevsk
 Gevorg Ghazaryan – Metalurh Donetsk
 Ara Hakobyan – Metalurh Donetsk, Stal Alchevsk, Illichivets Mariupol
 Aram Hakobyan – Illichivets Mariupol
 Arman Hovhannisyan – Zirka Kropyvnytskyi – 2017–18 
 Rumyan Hovsepyan – Metalurh Donetsk, Stal Dniprodzerzhynsk
 Gegham Kadimyan – Hoverla Uzhhorod, Olimpik Donetsk, Karpaty Lviv, Zorya Luhansk, Vorskla Poltava, Arsenal Kyiv
 Arman Karamyan – Arsenal Kyiv
 Artavazd Karamyan – Arsenal Kyiv – 2003–04
 Vardan Khachatryan – Metalurh Zaporizhzhia
 Edgar Malakyan – Stal Kamianske – 2015–18
 Yegishe Melikyan – Metalurh Donetsk, Stal Alchevsk, Zorya Luhansk
 Samvel Melkonyan – Metalurh Donetsk
 Henrikh Mkhitaryan – Metalurh Donetsk, Shakhtar Donetsk – 2009–13
 Karlen Mkrtchyan – Metalurh Donetsk
 Marcos Pizzelli – Metalurh Donetsk
 Albert Sarkisyan – Arsenal Kyiv
 Armen Shahgeldyan – Chornomorets Odesa
 Yervand Sukiasyan – Dynamo Kyiv – 1992–93
 Artak Yedigaryan – Metalurh Donetsk
 Tigran Yesayan – Torpedo Zaporizhzhia

Aruba 
 Erixon Danso – Stal Kamianske –

Austria 
 Markus Berger – Chornomorets Odesa – 2011–14
 Aleksandar Dragović – Dynamo Kyiv – 2013–17

Azerbaijan 
 Tarlan Ahmadov – Volyn Lutsk – 2003–04
 Rustam Akhmedzade – Mynai – 2020–22
 Samir Aliyev – Volyn Lutsk – 2002–04
 Kamal Guliyev – Volyn Lutsk – 2002–04
 Jahangir Hasanzade – Tavriya Simferopol – 2003–04
 Farrukh Ismayilov – Volyn Lutsk – 2003–04
 Samir Khairov – Zorya Luhansk – 1995–96
 Vladislav Nosenko – Kryvbas Kryvyi Rih, Zirka Kirovohrad – 1992–98, 1999–2000
 Anatoliy Nuriyev – Stal Kamianske, Mynai, Kolos Kovalivka – 2017–18, 2020–
 Pavlo Pashayev – Kryvbas Kryvyi Rih, Dnipro Dnipropetrovsk, Karpaty Lviv, Metalurh Zaporizhzhia, Stal Kamianske, Oleksandriya – 2008–11, 2012–21
 Andrey Popovich – Mynai – 2020–21
 Mahmud Qurbanov – Tavriya Simferopol – 2003–04
 Elhan Rasulov – Karpaty Lviv – 1993–98
 Branimir Subašić – Chornomorets Odesa – 2003–04
 Elman Sultanov – Torpedo Zaporizhzhia – 1993–94
 Vadim Vasilyev – Tavriya Simferopol – 2003–04
 Ilham Yadullayev – Volyn Lutsk, Tavriya Simferopol – 2002–04
 Aleksandr Zhidkov – Nyva Vinnytsia – 1992

Belarus 
 Syarhey Amelyanchuk – Arsenal Kyiv – 2002–05
 Dzmitry Asipenka – Vorskla Poltava
 Andrey Astrowski – Arsenal Kyiv, Chornomorets Odesa
 Valyantsin Byalkevich – Dynamo Kyiv – 1996–2007
 Yawhen Branavitski – Vorskla Poltava
 Pavel Byahanski – Illichivets Mariupol
 Artsyom Chelyadzinski – Metalurh Zaporizhzhia
 Alyaksandr Danilaw – Metalist Kharkiv, Metalurh Donetsk, Arsenal Kyiv – 2004–11
 Uladzimir Haew – Chornomorets Odesa
 Barys Haravoy – Metalurh Zaporizhzhia
 Ihar Hurynovich – Veres Rivne
 Syarhey Kabelski – Metalurh Zaporizhzhia
 Tsimafey Kalachow – Shakhtar Donetsk, Illichivets Mariupol
 Heorhiy Kandratsyew – Temp Shepetivka
 Syarhey Karnilenka – Dynamo Kyiv, Dnipro Dnipropetrovsk
 Maksim Karpovich – Vorskla Poltava
 Uladzimir Karytska – Metalurh Zaporizhzhia, Chornomorets Odesa, Metalurh Donetsk
 Mikalay Kashewski – Metalurh Zaporizhzhia, Kryvbas Kryvyi Rih, Illichivets Mariupol, Tavriya Simferopol – 2003–11
 Alyaksandr Khatskevich – Dynamo Kyiv – 1996–2003
 Vasil Khamutowski  – Metalist Kharkiv, Tavriya Simferopol
 Pavel Kirylchyk – Kryvbas Kryvyi Rih, Chornomorets Odesa, Karpaty Lviv, Illichivets Mariupol
 Mihail Konopelko – Tavriya Simferopol
 Nikita Korzun – Dynamo Kyiv – 2016–17
 Konstantin Kovalenko – Kremin Kremenchuk
 Leanid Kovel – Karpaty Lviv
 Dzyanis Kowba – Zirka Kirovohrad
 Syarhey Kukalevich – Tavriya Simferopol
 Syarhey Kuznyatsow – Metalist Kharkiv, Tavriya Simferopol, Arsenal Kyiv – 2004–09
 Vital Lanko – Volyn Lutsk
 Yawhen Lashankow – Chornomorets Odesa, Kharkiv
 Artur Lesko – Kryvbas Kryvyi Rih
 Yawhen Linyow – Metalurh Zaporizhzhia, Tavriya Simferopol
 Mihail Makowski – Dynamo Kyiv, Vorskla Poltava, CSKA Kyiv, Zakarpattia Uzhhorod
 Uladzimir Makowski – Dynamo Kyiv, Vorskla Poltava, CSKA Kyiv, Zakarpattia Uzhhorod
 Henadz Mardas – Tavriya Simferopol
 Yuri Markhel – Metalurh Zaporizhzhia
 Artur Matsveychyk – Kryvbas Kryvyi Rih
 Alyaksey Pankavets – Kharkiv
 Aleksandr Pavlovets – Kolos Kovalivka – 2021–
 Pavel Radnyonak – Veres Rivne
 Gleb Rassadkin – Zirka Kropyvnytskyi – 2017–18 
 Ihar Razhkow – Kryvbas Kryvyi Rih
 Alyaksandr Shahoyka – Kryvbas Kryvyi Rih
 Ilya Shkurin – Dynamo Kyiv – 2021–
 Syarhey Shtanyuk – Metalurh Zaporizhzhia
 Mikhail Sivakow – Chornomorets Odesa, Zorya Luhansk – 2014–17
 Alyaksey Suchkow – Karpaty Lviv, Kharkiv
 Yan Tsiharow – Metalurh Zaporizhzhia
 Andrey Varankaw – Obolon Kyiv, Kryvbas Kryvyi Rih
 Syarhey Vyeramko – Kharkiv, Sevastopol
 Syarhey Yaskovich – Shakhtar Donetsk
 Alyaksandr Yurevich – Karpaty Lviv
 Nikolay Zolotov – Kolos Kovalivka – 2021–

Belgium 
 Ibrahim Kargbo Jr. – Dynamo Kyiv, Olimpik Donetsk – 2019–21

Bolivia 
 Marcelo Moreno – Shakhtar Donetsk
 Gustavo Pinedo – Chornomorets Odesa
 Mauricio Saucedo – Chornomorets Odesa

Bosnia and Herzegovina 
 Spomenko Bošnjak – Metalurh Zaporizhzhia
 Đorđe Inđić – Chornomorets Odesa
 Igor Joksimović – Zakarpattia Uzhhorod
 Branislav Krunić – Volyn Lutsk – 2004–05
 Edin Kunić – Karpaty Lviv
 Amar Kvakić – Metalist 1925 Kharkiv – 2021
 Sead Ramović – Metalurh Zaporizhzhia – 2011
 Zdravko Šaraba – Volyn Lutsk
 Sergej Tica – Stal Alchevsk
 Nikola Vasilj – Zorya Luhansk – 2020–21

Brazil 
 Aílton – Metalurh Donetsk
 Alan – Stal Alchevsk, Metalurh Donetsk, Arsenal Kyiv – 2007–08
 Alan Patrick – Shakhtar Donetsk – 2011–13, 2016–2022
 Alcides – Dnipro Dnipropetrovsk – 2008–10
 Alessandro – Dynamo Kyiv
 Alex da Silva – Metalurh Donetsk – 2013–15
 Leandro Almeida – Dynamo Kyiv
 Alvaro – Lviv – 2019–20, 2021
 Anderson Ribeiro – Metalist Kharkiv, Kharkiv, Metalurh Zaporizhzhia – 2004–09, 2010
 André – Dynamo Kyiv – 2010
 Danilo Avelar – Karpaty Lviv
 Márcio Azevedo – Metalist Kharkiv, Shakhtar Donetsk – 2013–15, 2017
 Gil Bala – Stal Alchevsk, Arsenal Kyiv
 João Batista – Shakhtar Donetsk
 William Batista – Karpaty Lviv, Kharkiv
 Bernard – Shakhtar Donetsk – 2013–18
 Betão – Dynamo Kyiv – 2008–12
 Matheus Bianchim – Metalurh Zaporizhzhia
 Bill – Dnipro-1 – 2020– 
 William Boaventura – Metalurh Donetsk
 Brandão – Shakhtar Donetsk – 2002–08
 Bruninho – Zirka Kropyvnytskyi – 2017
 Vitor Bueno – Dynamo Kyiv – 2018 
 Diego Carioca – Kolos Kovalivka – 2021–
 Alessandro Celin – Volyn Lutsk – 2013–14 
 Júlio César – Metalurh Donetsk
 China – Karpaty Lviv, Lviv – 2017, 2019–21
 Clayton – Dynamo Kyiv – 2020–21
 Cleyton – Metalurh Donetsk
 André Conceição – Metalist Kharkiv – 2005
 Corrêa – Dynamo Kyiv
 Rogério Corrêa – Illichivets Mariupol
 Douglas Costa – Shakhtar Donetsk – 2010–15
 Leo Costa – Volyn Lutsk
 Cristian – Zorya Luhansk – 2021–
 Davidson – Dnipro Dnipropetrovsk
 Dentinho – Shakhtar Donetsk – 2011–12, 2014–21 
 Flávio Dias – Zorya Luhansk
 Diego Souza – Metalist Kharkiv – 2013–14 
 Dodô – Shakhtar Donetsk – 2018, 2019–
 Douglas – Dnipro Dnipropetrovsk, Dnipro-1 – 2013–15, 2020–21  
 Fábio Duarte – Metalurh Zaporizhzhia
 Dudu – Dynamo Kyiv – 2011–13 
 Edmar – Tavriya Simferopol, Metalist Kharkiv – 2003–11
 Elano – Shakhtar Donetsk – 2005–07
 Jorge Elias – Chornomorets Odesa – 2017 
 Émerson – Dnipro Dnipropetrovsk – 1996
 Everton – Tavriya Simferopol
 Fabinho – Metalist 1925 Kharkiv – 2021–
 Fabinho – Metalurh Donetsk
 Fernandinho – Shakhtar Donetsk – 2005–13
 Fernando – Shakhtar Donetsk – 2018–22
 Fininho – Metalist Kharkiv – 2010–13
 Giuliano – Dnipro Dnipropetrovsk
 Junior Godoi – Tavriya Simferopol, Zorya Luhansk,  Metalurh Zaporizhzhia
 Vagner Gonçalves – Dnipro-1 – 2021
 Marcinho Guerreiro – Metalurh Donetsk – 2007
 Guilherme – Dynamo Kyiv
 Guttiner – Olimpik Donetsk, Chornomorets Odesa – 2017–18 
 Ilsinho – Shakhtar Donetsk
 Ismaily – Shakhtar Donetsk – 2013– 
 Ivan – Shakhtar Donetsk
 Jader – Metalist Kharkiv – 2005–06
 Jádson – Shakhtar Donetsk – 2005–11
 Jajá – Metalist Kharkiv – 2008–10, 2013, 2014
 Jeferson – Metalurh Zaporizhzhia
 Juninho – Zorya Luhansk – 2020– 
 Kléber – Dynamo Kyiv – 2004–07
 Leândro – Zakarpattia Uzhhorod, Tavriya Simferopol
 Leandro – Metalurh Donetsk
 Leonardo – Shakhtar Donetsk
 Leonardo – Metalurh Donetsk – 2013
 Leonidas – Zorya Luhansk
 Lima – Illichivets Mariupol
 Fabiano Lima – Metalurh Zaporizhzhia
 Ramon Lopes – Volyn Lutsk
 Luiz Adriano – Shakhtar Donetsk – 2007–15
 Luizão – Vorskla Poltava – 2019–20, 2021
 Leandro Machado – Dynamo Kyiv
 Gérson Magrão – Dynamo Kyiv
 Maicon – Volyn Lutsk, Shakhtar Donetsk, Zorya Luhansk, Illichivets Mariupol – 2010, 2011–13
 Marcelo – Metalist Kharkiv – 2005
 Marcos Antônio – Shakhtar Donetsk – 2018–22 
 Marlon – Shakhtar Donetsk – 2021–22
 Marlos – Metalist Kharkiv, Shakhtar Donetsk – 2012–17
 Marlyson – Metalist 1925 Kharkiv – 2021–
 Marquinhos Cipriano – Shakhtar Donetsk – 2018–21 
 Matheus – Metalurh Zaporizhzhia
 Matheus – Dnipro Dnipropetrovsk – 2011–16
 Léo Matos – Chornomorets Odesa
 Matuzalém – Shakhtar Donetsk – 2004–07
 Maycon – Shakhtar Donetsk – 2018–22
 Mateus Mendes – Chornomorets Odesa – 2016
 Michael – Dynamo Kyiv
 Júnior Moraes – Metalurh Donetsk, Dynamo Kyiv, Shakhtar Donetsk – 2012–16, 2017–19
 Nailson – Zirka Kropyvnytskyi – 2017
 Hadson Nery – Tavriya Simferopol
 Renan Oliveira – Lviv, Kolos Kovalivka – 2019–20, 2021– 
 Roger de Oliveira – Tavriya Simferopol
 Sérgio Oliveira – Metalurh Donetsk
 Filipe Pachtmann – Lviv – 2019–20
 Marcos Paulo – Metalist Kharkiv
 Pedrinho – Shakhtar Donetsk – 2021–
 Eric Pereira – Karpaty Lviv
 Fábio Pereira – Vorskla Poltava
 Pernambuco – Lviv – 2019
 Anderson Pico – Dnipro Dnipropetrovsk
 Rafael Ratão – Zorya Luhansk – 2018–19 
 Rangel – Vorskla Poltava – 2021–
 Wesley Ribeiro – Kryvbas Kryvyi Rih
 Diogo Rincón – Dynamo Kyiv – 2002–07
 Rodolfo – Dynamo Kyiv – 2004–06 
 Rodrigo – Dynamo Kyiv
 Sidcley – Dynamo Kyiv – 2018–19, 2020–22
 Silas – Zorya Luhansk
 Danilo Silva – Dynamo Kyiv – 2010–16
 Sílvio – Chornomorets Odesa – 2016–18 
 Zé Soares – Metalurh Donetsk
 Adriano Spadoto – Zorya Luhansk
 Taison – Metalist Kharkiv, Shakhtar Donetsk – 2010–21
 Talles – Olimpik Donetsk, Rukh Lviv – 2021– 
 Tchê Tchê – Dynamo Kyiv – 2018–19 
 Alex Teixeira – Shakhtar Donetsk – 2010–15
 Tetê – Shakhtar Donetsk – 2019– 
 Thiago – Karpaty Lviv
 Rodrigo Toledo – Metalurh Zaporizhzhia
 Léo Veloso – Chornomorets Odesa
 Vitão – Shakhtar Donetsk – 2020– 
 Vitinho – Dynamo Kyiv – 2021–  
 Paulo Vogt – Metalurh Donetsk, Stal Alchevsk – 2006–07
 Washington – Metalurh Zaporizhzhia
 Welves – Lviv – 2019–20 
 Willian – Shakhtar Donetsk – 2007–12
 Cleiton Xavier – Metalist Kharkiv – 2010–14

Bulgaria 
 Velizar Dimitrov – Metalurh Donetsk
 Valentin Iliev – Metalurh Zaporizhzhia
 Velin Kefalov – Vorskla Poltava
 Vasyl Kolev – Nyva Ternopil
 Aleksandar Mladenov – Sevastopol
 Yulian Neichev – Nyva Ternopil
 Predrag Pažin – Shakhtar Donetsk
 Georgi Peev – Dynamo Kyiv, Dnipro Dnipropetrovsk
 Yordan Petkov – Vorskla Poltava
 Stanimir Stalev – Nyva Ternopil
 Aleksandar Tomash – Metalurh Zaporizhzhia
 Chavdar Yankov – Metalurh Donetsk

Burkina Faso 
 Aristide Bancé – Metalurh Donetsk –
 Lassina Traoré – Shakhtar Donetsk – 2021–

Cameroon 
 Alain Amougou – Metalist Kharkiv – 2002
 Jules Baga – Zorya Luhansk
 Joyskim Dawa – Mariupol – 2017–20
 Paul Essola – Stal Alchevsk, Arsenal Kyiv, Dnipro Dnipropetrovsk – 2007–10
 Ngassam Nana Falemi – Volyn Lutsk
 Patrick Ibanda – Vorskla Poltava, Arsenal Kyiv, Zorya Luhansk, Kryvbas Kryvyi Rih
 Eric Kamdem Kamdem – Illichivets Mariupol
 Éric Matoukou – Arsenal Kyiv, Volyn Lutsk – 2012–13 
 Moses Esingila Molongo – Volyn Lutsk, Vorskla Poltava
 Alvaro Ngamba – Kolos Kovalivka – 2021–
 Colince Ngaha Poungoue – Zorya Luhansk
 Ernest Siankam – Volyn Lutsk
 Adolphe Teikeu – Metalurh Zaporizhzhia
 Bernard Tchoutang – Metalurh Donetsk – 2002–03

Canada 
 Milan Božić – Volyn Lutsk – 2005
 Osaze De Rosario – Rukh Lviv – 2021–22

Cape Verde 
 Fábio Silva – Metalurh Zaporizhzhia – 2010–11

Colombia 
 Nelson Rivas – Dnipro Dnipropetrovsk

Congo 
 Rudy Ndey – Zorya Luhansk – 2006
 Patrick Iwosso – Zorya Luhansk – 2006
 Burnel Okana-Stazi – Stal Alchevsk – 2005–07

Costa Rica 
 Ronald Matarrita – Dnipro-1 – 2023-
 Jonathan Moya – Zirka Kropyvnytskyi – 2016
 John Jairo Ruiz – Dnipro Dnipropetrovsk – 2015–16

Croatia  
 Valter Androšić – Vorskla Poltava
 Mladen Bartulović – Dnipro Dnipropetrovsk, Kryvbas Kryvyi Rih, Arsenal Kyiv, Karpaty Lviv, Vorskla Poltava, Inhulets Petrove – 2006–16, 2020–
 Petar Bosančić – Mariupol – 2021–22
 Goran Brajković – Arsenal Kyiv
 Dario Brgles – Arsenal Kyiv
 Frane Čirjak – Lviv – 2020– 
 Mario Ćuže – Dnipro-1 – 2021– 
 Lovro Cvek – Zorya Luhansk – 2020– 
 Mario Dodić – Metalurh Zaporizhzhia
 Neven Đurasek – Dnipro-1 – 2021– 
 Saša Đuričić – Vorskla Poltava, Tavriya Simferopol – 2005–11
 Eduardo – Shakhtar Donetsk
 Denis Glavina – Vorskla Poltava, Dnipro Dnipropetrovsk
 Ivan Graf – Tavriya Simferopol – 2011
 Igor Jovićević – Karpaty Lviv – 2003
 Nikola Kalinić – Dnipro Dnipropetrovsk – 2011–15 
 Jerko Leko – Dynamo Kyiv
 Marin Ljubičić – Tavriya Simferopol
 Mislav Matić – Mynai – 2020–
 Jerko Mikulić – Karpaty Lviv
 Ivan Pešić – Vorskla Poltava – 2020, 2021– 
 Ivica Pirić – Arsenal Kyiv
 Josip Pivarić – Dynamo Kyiv – 2017–18, 2020
 Stipe Pletikosa – Shakhtar Donetsk
 David Puclin – Vorskla Poltava – 2020– 
 Jurica Puljiz – Zorya Luhansk
 Goran Sablić – Dynamo Kyiv
 Krševan Santini – Zorya Luhansk – 2012–16 
 Mirko Selak – Metalurh Zaporizhzhia
 Matija Špičić – Tavriya Simferopol
 Darijo Srna – Shakhtar Donetsk – 2003–17
 Ivan Strinić – Dnipro Dnipropetrovsk – 2011–14
 Ronald Šiklić – Kryvbas Kryvyi Rih
 Domagoj Vida – Dynamo Kyiv – 2013–17
 Tomislav Višević – Metalurh Zaporizhzhia
 Ognjen Vukojević – Dynamo Kyiv
 Ivica Žuljević – Metalurh Donetsk
 Ivica Žunić – Volyn Lutsk, Chornomorets Odesa – 2014–16, 2017–18

Curaçao  
 Sendley Bito – Stal Alchevsk, Arsenal Kyiv, Zakarpattia Uzhhorod, Tavriya Simferopol – 2006–08, 2009–10 ( while active)

Cyprus  
 Constantinos Makrides – Metalurh Donetsk

Czech Republic  
 Mario Holek – Dnipro Dnipropetrovsk
 Tomáš Hübschman – Shakhtar Donetsk
 Jiří Jeslínek – Kryvbas Kryvyi Rih
 Jan Laštůvka – Shakhtar Donetsk, Dnipro Dnipropetrovsk
 Ondřej Mazuch – Dnipro Dnipropetrovsk – 2012–14

Denmark  
 Mikkel Duelund – Dynamo Kyiv – 2018–21

DR Congo  
 Nzelo Hervé Lembi – Metalurh Donetsk
 Dieumerci Mbokani – Dynamo Kyiv – 2013–15, 2017–18
 Mafoumba Mfilu – CSKA Kyiv
 Aurélien Ngeyitala – Arsenal Kyiv – 2018

Ecuador  
 Peter Mercado  – Vorskla Poltava
 Narciso Mina – Chornomorets Odesa

Estonia  
 Mihkel Ainsalu – Lviv – 2020
 Tarmo Kink – Karpaty Lviv – 2012 
 Stanislav Kitto – Zorya Luhansk – 1996
 Aleksandr Marašov – Zorya Luhansk – 1996
 Jevgeni Novikov – Zirka Kirovohrad – 2004
 Taavi Rähn – Volyn Lutsk – 2004–06 
 Joonas Tamm – Desna Chernihiv, Vorskla Poltava – 2020– 
 Sergei Zenjov – Karpaty Lviv – 2008–14

Finland  
 Alexei Eremenko – Metalist Kharkiv
 Roman Eremenko – Dynamo Kyiv – 2008–12
 Veli Lampi – Arsenal Kyiv
 Abukar Mohamed – Karpaty Lviv – 2019–20

France  
 Joël Bopesu – Lviv – 2019–20
 Serigne Diop – Stal Alchevsk – 2006–07
 Issiar Dramé – Olimpik Donetsk – 2020–21 
 David Faupala – Zorya Luhansk – 2018  
 Arnaud Guedj – Zirka Kropyvnytskyi – 2017–18
 Hicham El Hamdaoui – Zirka Kropyvnytskyi – 2017
 Damien Le Tallec – Hoverla Uzhhorod – 2012–14
 Maroine Mihoubi – Lviv – 2020–21
 Alassane N'Diaye – Chornomorets Odesa – 2017
 Pape-Alioune Ndiaye – Vorskla Poltava – 2019–21
 Cécé Pepe – Zirka Kropyvnytskyi – 2017 
 Julian Rullier – Zirka Kropyvnytskyi – 2018
 Maxime Teixeira – Olimpik Donetsk – 2018–21
 Benoît Trémoulinas – Dynamo Kyiv – 2013, 2014
 Mamadou Wagué – Chornomorets Odesa – 2017–18
 Curtis Yebli – Arsenal Kyiv – 2018
 Karim Yoda – Karpaty Lviv – 2019

Gabon  
 Gaëtan Missi Mezu – Arsenal Kyiv – 2019

Georgia  
 Kakhaber Aladashvili – Temp Shepetivka
 Kakhaber Aladashvili – Dynamo Kyiv, Dnipro Dnipropetrovsk, Zakarpattia Uzhhorod, Kharkiv
 Aleksandr Amisulashvili – Tavriya Simferopol
 Shalva Apkhazava – Arsenal Kyiv
 Malkhaz Asatiani – Dynamo Kyiv
 Giorgi Babuadze – Temp Shepetivka
 Revazi Barabadze – Dnipro Dnipropetrovsk
 Niazi Brunjadze – Temp Shepetivka, Mykolaiv
 Vladimir Burduli – Kryvbas Kryvyi Rih, Zorya Luhansk, Tavriya Simferopol, Zakarpattia Uzhhorod
 David Chaladze – Temp Shepetivka
 Grigol Chanturia – Tavriya Simferopol, Zakarpattia Uzhhorod
 Vakhtang Chanturishvili – Oleksandriya
 Giorgi Chelidze – Zorya Luhansk
 Lasha Chelidze – Metalurh Zaporizhzhia
 Giorgi Chikhradze – Temp Shepetivka, Shakhtar Donetsk
 Kakhaber Chkhetiani – Tavriya Simferopol
 Zviadi Chkhetiani – Tavriya Simferopol
 Shota Chomakhidze – Nyva Ternopil, Tavriya Simferopol
 Vitaly Daraselia – CSKA Kyiv
 Giorgi Davitnidze – Nyva Ternopil
 Giorgi Demetradze – Dynamo Kyiv, Metalurh Donetsk, Arsenal Kyiv – 2000, 2003–05, 2006–08
 Kakhaber Dgebuadze – Nyva Ternopil
 Temur Dimitrishvili – Zorya Luhansk
 Giorgi Gabedava – Illichivets Mariupol
 Iuri Gabiskiria – Temp Shepetivka, Shakhtar Donetsk, Kryvbas Kryvyi Rih
 Teymuraz Gadelia – Veres Rivne
 Giorgi Gadrani – Chornomorets Odesa – 2015
 Paata Gamtsemlidze – Temp Shepetivka
 Giorgi Gakhokidze – Metalurh Donetsk
 Mate Ghvinianidze – Sevastopol
 Vasil Gigiadze – Tavriya Simferopol, Kryvbas Kryvyi Rih, Naftovyk-Ukrnafta Okhtyrka – 2000–03, 2004–11
 Beka Gotsiridze – Dnipro Dnipropetrovsk
 Revaz Gotsiridze – Kryvbas Kryvyi Rih
 Alexander Guruli – Karpaty Lviv
 Gia Gvazava – Temp Shepetivka
 Avtandil Gvianidze – Nyva Ternopil
 Grigol Imedadze – Tavriya Simferopol – 2004
 Davit Imedashvili – Dynamo Kyiv
 Zurab Ionanidze – Tavriya Simferopol
 Lasha Jakobia – Metalist Kharkiv, Arsenal Kyiv – 2004–07, 2009
 Gocha Jamarauli – Metalurh Donetsk
 Mikheil Jishkariani – Dynamo Kyiv
 Mamuka Jugeli – Temp Shepetivka, Zorya Luhansk, Tavriya Simferopol, Prykarpattya Ivano-Frankivsk, Mykolaiv
 Aleksandr Kaidarashvili – Nyva Ternopil, Kryvbas Kryvyi Rih
 Kakha Kaladze – Dynamo Kyiv – 1998–2000
 Ilia Kandelaki – Chornomorets Odesa
 Jaba Kankava – Arsenal Kyiv, Dnipro Dnipropetrovsk, Kryvbas Kryvyi Rih
 Avtandil Kapanadze – Temp Shepetivka, Nyva Ternopil
 Tariel Kapanadze – Temp Shepetivka, Nyva Ternopil
 Anzor Kavteladze – Kremin Kremenchuk
 Davit Khocholava – Chornomorets Odesa, Shakhtar Donetsk – 2015–21
 Shalva Khujadze – Nyva Ternopil
 Vakhtang Khvadagiani – Veres Rivne
 Giorgi Kilasonia – Dnipro Dnipropetrovsk
 Varlam Kilasonia – Dnipro Dnipropetrovsk
 Aleksandre Kobakhidze – Dnipro Dnipropetrovsk, Kryvbas Kryvyi Rih, Arsenal Kyiv
 Anzor Kovteladze  – Vorskla Poltava
 Dato Kvirkvelia – Metalurh Zaporizhzhia
 Solomon Kvirkvelia – Metalist 1925 Kharkiv – 2021–
 Gela Kvitatiani – Zorya Luhansk
 Jaba Lipartia – Zorya Luhansk
 Ucha Lobjanidze – Dnipro Dnipropetrovsk
 Giorgi Lomaia – Karpaty Lviv
 Temur Margoshia – Mykolaiv
 Otar Martsvaladze – Dynamo Kyiv, Zakarpattia Uzhhorod
 Konstantin Metreveli – Nyva Ternopil
 Levan Mikadze – CSKA Kyiv, Arsenal Kyiv, Kryvbas Kryvyi Rih
 Irakli Modebadze – Metalurh Zaporizhzhia, Chornomorets Odesa
 Kakhaber Mzhavanadze – Chornomorets Odesa
 Tornike Okriashvili – Illichivets Mariupol
 Sergi Orbeladze – Illichivets Mariupol
 Tamaz Pertia – Temp Shepetivka
 Zurab Popkhadze – Kryvbas Kryvyi Rih
 Mikhail Potskhveria – Zorya Luhansk, Metalurh Zaporizhzhia, Shakhtar Donetsk, Dnipro Dnipropetrovsk
 Alexander Rekhviashvili – Temp Shepetivka
 Mamuka Rusia – Temp Shepetivka
 Giorgi Shashiashvili – Chornomorets Odesa
 Gela Shekiladze – Arsenal Kyiv
 Irakli Shengelia – Nyva Ternopil
 Nika Sichinava – Inhulets Petrove, Kolos Kovalivka – 2020– 
 Avtandil Sikharulidze – Nyva Ternopil
 Merab Tevzadze – Temp Shepetivka
 Gocha Trapaidze – Tavriya Simferopol
 Georgi Tsimakuridze – Stal Alchevsk, Illichivets Mariupol, Zorya Luhansk
 Heorhiy Tsitaishvili – Dynamo Kyiv, Vorskla Poltava, Chornomorets Odesa – 2018–22
 Levan Tskitishvili – Metalurh Donetsk – 2005
 Tengiz Ugrekhelidze – Nyva Ternopil
 Gocha Zhorzholiani – Temp Shepetivka

Germany  
 David Odonkor – Hoverla Uzhhorod – 2012
 Andreas Sassen – Dnipro Dnipropetrovsk – 1995

Ghana  
 Daniel Addo – Zorya Luhansk – 2011–13
 Ernest Antwi – Rukh Lviv, Lviv – 2020–21 
 Derek Boateng – Dnipro Dnipropetrovsk – 2011–12
 Samuel Inkoom – Dnipro Dnipropetrovsk
 Mohammed Kadiri – Dynamo Kyiv, Chornomorets Odesa – 2019–20, 2021–22 
 Kwame Karikari – Stal Kamianske
 Raymond Owusu – Zorya Luhansk – 2021–
 Najeeb Yakubu – Vorskla Poltava – 2018–

Guinea  
 Ismaël Bangoura – Dynamo Kyiv – 2007–09
 Mohamed Alkhaly Soumah – Karpaty Lviv

Guinea-Bissau  
 Pelé – Arsenal Kyiv – 2012–13

Hungary  
 Tamás Kádár – Dynamo Kyiv – 2017–19
 László Bodnár – Dynamo Kyiv, Arsenal Kyiv – 2000–04
 Balázs Farkas – Dynamo Kyiv
 Zsolt Nagy – Polihraftekhnika Oleksandria, Zakarpattia Uzhhorod, Chornomorets Odesa

Iceland  
 Ragnar Sigurðsson – Rukh Lviv – 2021
 Árni Vilhjálmsson – Chornomorets Odesa, Kolos Kovalivka – 2019–20

Iran  
 Allahyar Sayyadmanesh – Zorya Luhansk – 2020–21
 Shahab Zahedi – Olimpik Donetsk, Zorya Luhansk – 2019–

Israel  
 Joel Abu Hanna – Zorya Luhansk – 2019–21
 Max Grechkin – Zorya Luhansk – 2020
 Hisham Layous – Karpaty Lviv – 2019–20 
 Gal Shish – Volyn Lutsk – 2013–15
 Manor Solomon – Shakhtar Donetsk – 2019–

Italy  
 Cristiano Lucarelli – Shakhtar Donetsk – 2007
 Gaetano Monachello – Metalurh Donetsk – 2012

Ivory Coast 
 Yannick Boli – Zorya Luhansk – 2013–14
 Franck Dja Djédjé – Chornomorets Odesa – 2012–13
 Abdoulaye Djiré – Metalurh Donetsk, Metalist Kharkiv – 2006–07, 2008
 Geo Danny Ekra – Olimpik Donetsk – 2021
 Igor Lolo – Metalurh Donetsk, Dnipro Dnipropetrovsk – 2004–05, 2008
 Franck Madou – Zorya Luhansk
 Arsène Né – Metalurh Donetsk – 2004–07
 Marco Né – Tavriya Simferopol – 2012–13 
 Shaib Touré – Stal Alchevsk – 2007
 Yaya Touré – Metalurh Donetsk – 2004–05 
 Venance Zézé – Metalurh Donetsk, Metalist Kharkiv

Kazakhstan  
 Vitaliy Abramov – Shakhtar Donetsk, Metalurh Donetsk, Zirka Kirovohrad
 Oleg Chukhleba – Zorya Luhansk, Dnipro Dnipropetrovsk
 Oleg Kapustnikov – Metalurh Donetsk
 Sergey Kostyuk – Chornomorets Odesa, Vorskla Poltava, Metalist Kharkiv
 Konstantin Ledovskikh – Dnipro Dnipropetrovsk
 Sergey Patsay – Zorya Luhansk
 Konstantin Pavlyuchenko – Nyva Ternopil, Dnipro Dnipropetrovsk, Kryvbas Kryvyi Rih
 Daniil Richard – Nyva Vinnytsia
 Fanas Salimov – Nyva Ternopil, Kryvbas Kryvyi Rih, Mykolaiv
 Anton Shokh – Nyva Ternopil, Kremin Kremenchuk, Mykolaiv
 Sergey Timofeev – Nyva Ternopil
 Evgeniy Yarovenko – Nyva Ternopil, Dnipro Dnipropetrovsk, Kryvbas Kryvyi Rih, Metalurh Zaporizhzhia – 1992–93, 1995–97
 Sergey Zhunenko – Zorya Luhansk, Shakhtar Donetsk, Metalurh Donetsk

Korea Republic  
 Hwang Hun-hee – Metalurh Zaporizhzhia
 Kim Pyung-rae – Metalurh Zaporizhzhia

Kosovo  
 Shpëtim Babaj – Zorya Luhansk – 
 Ardin Dallku – Vorskla Poltava – 2016–19
 Betim Halimi – Olimpik Donetsk – 
 Ismet Munishi – Vorskla Poltava – 2004–05

Kuwait  
 Naser al-Sohi – Dynamo Kyiv

Kyrgyzstan  
 Aleksandr Agarin – Vorskla Poltava
 Tagir Fasakhov – Nyva Ternopil, Prykarpattya Ivano-Frankivsk
 Oleg Kazmirchuk – Kremin Kremenchuk, Nyva Ternopil
 Vitaliy Kobzar – Vorskla Poltava, Obolon Kyiv

Latvia  
 Andrejs Cigaņiks – Zorya Luhansk – 2020–21
 Kaspars Dubra – Oleksandriya – 2019–
 Jevgenijs Gorjacilovs – Metalurh Zaporizhzhia
 Vladimirs Koļesņičenko – Chornomorets Odesa
 Igors Korabļovs – Kryvbas Kryvyi Rih
 Raimonds Laizāns – Karpaty Lviv
 Valentīns Lobaņovs – Metalurh Zaporizhzhia
 Artūrs Silagailis – Kryvbas Kryvyi Rih
 Andrejs Štolcers – Shakhtar Donetsk
 Māris Verpakovskis – Dynamo Kyiv – 2004–06
 Armands Zeiberliņš – Metalurh Zaporizhzhia

Lithuania  
 Vidas Alunderis – Metalist Kharkiv, Tavriya Simferopol
 Andrius Brazauskas – Metalurh Zaporizhzhia
 Edgaras Česnauskis – Dynamo Kyiv
 Andrius Gedgaudas – Metalurh Donetsk
 Dainius Gleveckas – Shakhtar Donetsk, Illichivets Mariupol
 Kęstutis Ivaškevičius – Kryvbas Kryvyi Rih
 Andrius Jokšas – Kryvbas Kryvyi Rih, CSKA Kyiv, Arsenal Kyiv, Vorskla Poltava, Tavriya Simferopol
 Mindaugas Kalonas – Metalurh Zaporizhzhia
 Donatas Kazlauskas – Lviv – 2020–21
 Linas Klimavičius – Dnipro Dnipropetrovsk
 Aurimas Kučys – Naftovyk-Ukrnafta Okhtyrka, Zakarpattia Uzhhorod
 Gintaras Kvitkauskas – Dynamo Kyiv, Veres Rivne – 1992–93
 Vytautas Lukša – Illichivets Mariupol, Arsenal Kyiv
 Valdemaras Martinkėnas – Dynamo Kyiv – 1992–93
 Darius Miceika – Metalurh Zaporizhzhia
 Saulius Mikoliūnas – Arsenal Kyiv
 Igoris Pankratjevas – Dynamo Kyiv, Zorya Luhansk, Nyva Ternopil
 Gediminas Paulauskas – Illichivets Mariupol
 Daniel Romanovskij – Olimpik Donetsk – 2019–21
 Mantas Samusiovas – Illichivets Mariupol
 Marius Skinderis – Stal Alchevsk, Metalurh Donetsk
 Nerijus Vasiliauskas – Tavriya Simferopol
 Audrius Veikutis – Tavriya Simferopol
 Vidmantas Vyšniauskas – Tavriya Simferopol – 1992–93
 Irmantas Zelmikas – Tavriya Simferopol

Luxembourg  
 Enes Mahmutovic – Lviv – 2020– 
 Gerson Rodrigues – Dynamo Kyiv – 2019–22
 Olivier Thill – Vorskla Poltava – 2021–

Mali  
 Siaka Bagayoko – Mynai – 2021– 
 Ibrahim Kane – Vorskla Poltava – 2018–

Mexico  
 Nery Castillo – Shakhtar Donetsk, Dnipro Dnipropetrovsk –

Moldova  
 Serghei Alexeev – Zakarpattia Uzhhorod – 2010
 Igor Andronic – Zakarpattia Uzhhorod – 2009–10
 Valeriu Andronic – Metalist Kharkiv – 2005
 Victor Barîșev – Kharkiv – 2005
 Andrian Bogdan – Zorya Luhansk – 2006
 Vitalie Bordian – Metalist Kharkiv, Hoverla Uzhhorod – 2005–12
 Vadim Bolohan – Zorya Luhansk, Zakarpattia Uzhhorod, Sevastopol, Karpaty Lviv – 2008–11, 2012
 Igor Bugaiov – Chornomorets Odesa, Metalurh Zaporizhzhia
 Vasile Caraus – Metalurh Zaporizhzhia
 Valeriu Catinsus – Chornomorets Odesa
 Boris Cebotari – Volyn Lutsk
 Victor Comleonoc – Obolon Kyiv
 Vladimir Cosse – Zirka Kirovohrad, Tavriya Simferopol
 Serghei Covalciuc – Karpaty Lviv
 Serghei Epureanu – Vorskla Poltava, Kryvbas Kryvyi Rih
 Vladimir Gaidamașciuc – Nyva Vinnytsia, Bukovyna Chernivtsi
 Mihail Ghecev – Veres Rivne – 2021–
 Alexandru Golban – Karpaty Lviv
 Alexandru Guzun – Nyva Vinnytsia
 Gheorghe Harea – Nyva Vinnytsia, Metalist Kharkiv
 Denis Ilescu – Kryvbas Kryvyi Rih
 Oleg Khromtsov – Borysfen Boryspil
 Serghei Lașcencov – Metalist Kharkiv, Illichivets Mariupol, Karpaty Lviv – 2004–08
 Vladislav Lungu – Vorskla Poltava
 Iurie Miterev – Chornomorets Odesa, Zorya Luhansk
 Alexandru Onica – Vorskla Poltava
 Igor Oprea – Chornomorets Odesa
 Alexandru Popovici – Dnipro Dnipropetrovsk, Kryvbas Kryvyi Rih, Zorya Luhansk – 2003–07
 Marcel Reșitca – Metalurh Zaporizhzhia, Zakarpattia Uzhhorod
 Alexei Savinov – Metalurh Zaporizhzhia, Volyn Lutsk, Zakarpattia Uzhhorod
 Gheorghe Stratulat – Dnipro Dnipropetrovsk
 Andrei Stroenco – Odesa, Kryvbas Kryvyi Rih
 Alexandru Suharev – Dnipro Dnipropetrovsk
 Vladimir Tanurcov – Stal Alchevsk
 Igor Țîgîrlaș – Metalist Kharkiv, Kharkiv, Metalurh Zaporizhzhia
 Eduard Văluță – Metalurh Zaporizhzhia, Naftovyk-Ukrnafta Okhtyrka

Montenegro  
 Darko Bojović – Illichivets Mariupol
 Miodrag Džudović – Volyn Lutsk – 2004–05 ( while active)
 Mladen Kašćelan – Karpaty Lviv
 Aleksandar Nedović – Volyn Lutsk
 Mirko Raičević – Zorya Luhansk, Chornomorets Odesa, Zakarpattia Uzhhorod

Morocco  
 Younès Belhanda – Dynamo Kyiv – 2013–15
 Badr El Kaddouri – Dynamo Kyiv
 Hicham Mahdoufi – Metalist Kharkiv
 Moha Rharsalla – Olimpik Donetsk – 2014–16, 2017

Netherlands  
 Hennos Asmelash – Inhulets Petrove – 2021–
 Sylvano Comvalius – Stal Kamianske – 
 Jordi Cruyff – Metalurh Donetsk – 2006–08
 Jeremain Lens – Dynamo Kyiv – 2013–15
 Gregory Nelson – Metalurh Donetsk –
 Bradley de Nooijer – Vorskla Poltava – 2021

Nigeria  
 Dele Adeleye – Metalurh Donetsk, Tavriya Simferopol – 2010–12
 Fanendo Adi – Metalurh Donetsk, Dynamo Kyiv, Tavriya Simferopol – 2011–12
 Patrick Agbo Umomo – Metalurh Donetsk
 Julius Aghahowa – Shakhtar Donetsk, Sevastopol – 2001–06, 2009–11
 Tony Alegbe – Metalurh Donetsk, Kryvbas Kryvyi Rih
 Jamiu Alimi – Tavriya Simferopol – 2011–12
 Michael Alozie – Metalurh Zaporizhzhia, Sevastopol
 Edward Anyamke – Karpaty Lviv
 Haruna Babangida – Metalurh Donetsk – 2005 
 Michel Babatunde – Kryvbas Kryvyi Rih
 Benito – Dynamo Kyiv, Olimpik Donetsk – 2019–21 
 Ayodeji Brown – Tavriya Simferopol
 Emmanuel Dennis – Zorya Luhansk
 Eddy Lord Dombraye – Volyn Lutsk, Zakarpattia Uzhhorod
 Joseph Eyimofe – Metalurh Donetsk
 Samson Godwin – Karpaty Lviv
 Stephen Gopey – Inhulets Petrove – 2021–
 Lukman Haruna – Dynamo Kyiv
 Lucky Idahor – Dynamo Kyiv, Vorskla Poltava, Karpaty Lviv, Tavriya Simferopol, Zorya Luhansk – 2001–03, 2006–13
 Pius Ikedia – Metalurh Donetsk
 Sheriff Isa – Olimpik Donetsk, Chornomorets Odesa – 2014–16 
 Sani Kaita – Metalist Kharkiv, Tavriya Simferopol – 2010, 2011
 Olarenwaju Kayode – Shakhtar Donetsk – 2017–19
 Sunny Ekeh Kingsley – Metalurh Donetsk
 Akeem Latifu – Stal Dniprodzerzhynsk – 2016
 Charles Newuche – Zakarpattia Uzhhorod
 Daniel Njoku – Vorskla Poltava
 Onyekachi Nwoha – Metalist Kharkiv, Zorya Luhansk – 2006–08
 Chukwudi Nworgu – Vorskla Poltava, Kryvbas Kryvyi Rih
 Ugochukwu Oduenyi – Mynai – 2021 
 Ochuko Ojobo – Metalurh Donetsk
 Gabriel Okechukwu – Karpaty Lviv – 2016
 Emmanuel Okoduwa – Vorskla Poltava, Arsenal Kyiv, Shakhtar Donetsk, Metalurh Donetsk – 2002–07
 Isaac Okoronkwo – Shakhtar Donetsk
 Samuel Okunowo – Metalurh Donetsk, Stal Alchevsk – 2006–07
 Harrison Omoko – Arsenal Kyiv, Vorskla Poltava, Volyn Lutsk, Tavriya Simferopol, Zorya Luhansk
 Frank Temile – Dynamo Kyiv
 Uchechukwu Uwakwe – Tavriya Simferopol
 Ayila Yussuf – Dynamo Kyiv, Metalist Kharkiv – 2003–12, 2014

North Macedonia  
 Martin Bogatinov  – Karpaty Lviv
 Filip Despotovski – Vorskla Poltava
 Mario Gjurovski – Metalurh Donetsk
 Igor Gjuzelov – Shakhtar Donetsk, Metalurh Donetsk – 2001–05
 Boban Grnčarov – Metalurh Donetsk, Stal Alchevsk, Tavriya Simferopol – 2003, 2005–07, 2014
 Besart Ibraimi – Sevastopol, Tavriya Simferopol
 Hristijan Kirovski – Metalurh Zaporizhzhia
 Vlade Lazarevski  – Metalist Kharkiv, Karpaty Lviv
 Dančo Masev – Metalurh Zaporizhzhia
 Igor Mitreski – Metalurh Zaporizhzhia
 Goran Popov – Dynamo Kyiv
 Agron Rufati – Zorya Luhansk – 2020–22
 Vanče Šikov – Volyn Lutsk – 2011–14
 Stefan Spirovski – Mariupol – 2021–22 
 Darko Tasevski – Metalurh Zaporizhzhia

Paraguay  
 Aldo Adorno – Metalurh Donetsk – 2014
 Derlis González – Dynamo Kyiv – 2015–18

Peru  
 José Carlos Fernández – Chornomorets Odesa
 Paolo de la Haza – Chornomorets Odesa
 Andrés Mendoza – Metalurh Donetsk – 2004–05, 2006–07
 Edgar Villamarín – Chornomorets Odesa

Poland  
 Marcin Burkhardt – Metalist Kharkiv
 Piotr Cetnarowicz – Kryvbas Kryvyi Rih
 Seweryn Gancarczyk – Arsenal Kyiv, Volyn Lutsk, Metalist Kharkiv – 2002–10 
 Paweł Hajduczek – Tavriya Simferopol, Metalurh Zaporizhzhia
 Tomasz Kędziora – Dynamo Kyiv – 2017–
 Piotr Klepczarek – Tavriya Simferopol
 Maciej Kowalczyk – Arsenal Kyiv
 Marcin Kowalczyk – Metalurh Donetsk
 Wojciech Kowalewski – Shakhtar Donetsk
 Mariusz Lewandowski – Shakhtar Donetsk, Sevastopol
 Maciej Nalepa – Karpaty Lviv, Kharkiv
 Marcin Nowak – Volyn Lutsk
 Łukasz Teodorczyk – Dynamo Kyiv – 2014–16

Portugal  
 Vitorino Antunes – Dynamo Kyiv – 2015–17
 Artur – Chornomorets Odesa – 2012
 David Caiado - Tavriya Simferopol, Metalist Kharkiv – 2014, 2015
 China – Metalurh Donetsk – 2009–12
 Ricardo Fernandes – Metalurh Donetsk – 2008–09, 2011
 Bruno Gama – Dnipro Dnipropetrovsk – 2013–16 
 Nélson Monte – Dnipro-1 – 2021–
 Nuno Pinto – Tavriya Simferopol – 2014
 Cristian Ponde – Karpaty Lviv – 2018–19
 Serginho – Metalurh Zaporizhzhia – 2013–14  
 Mário Sérgio – Metalurh Donetsk – 2008–12
 Filipe Teixeira – Metalurh Donetsk – 2010
 João Teixeira – Oleksandriya – 2019
 Tiago Terroso – Chornomorets Odesa – 2012
 Miguel Veloso – Dynamo Kyiv – 2012–16

Republic of Ireland  
 Darren O'Dea – Metalurh Donetsk

Romania  
 Marian Aliuță – Shakhtar Donetsk, Metalurh Donetsk
 Cătălin Anghel – Stal Alchevsk
 Iulian Arhire – Volyn Lutsk, Metalurh Donetsk
 Tudor Băluță – Dynamo Kyiv – 2020
 Cosmin Bărcăuan – Shakhtar Donetsk
 Daniel Baston – Metalurh Zaporizhzhia
 Eric Bicfalvi  – Volyn Lutsk
 Cornel Buta – Volyn Lutsk
 Lucian Burdujan – Chornomorets Odesa, Tavriya Simferopol, Hoverla Uzhhorod
 Florin Cernat – Dynamo Kyiv
 Augustin Chiriță – Karpaty Lviv
 Daniel Chiriță – Shakhtar Donetsk, Stal Alchevsk
 Răzvan Cociș – Karpaty Lviv, Hoverla Uzhhorod
 Valentin Cojocaru – Dnipro-1 – 2021–22  
 Alexandru Dandea – Hoverla Uzhhorod
 Iulian Dăniță – Tavriya Simferopol, Metalist Kharkiv – 2002–03, 2004–05
 Constantin Dima – Desna Chernihiv – 2021
 Lucian Dobre – Tavriya Simferopol
 Dan Găldeanu – Dnipro Dnipropetrovsk, Kryvbas Kryvyi Rih
 Daniel Florea – Shakhtar Donetsk, Metalurh Donetsk, Metalurh Zaporizhzhia
 Tiberiu Ghioane – Dynamo Kyiv – 2001–11
 Bogdan Hauși – Hoverla Uzhhorod
 Cristian Irimia – Dynamo Kyiv
 Silviu Izvoranu – Volyn Lutsk
 Mihai Leca – Lviv – 2021– 
 Catalin Lichioiu – Vorskla Poltava
 Bogdan Mara – Stal Alchevsk
 Florentin Matei  – Volyn Lutsk
 Ciprian Marica – Shakhtar Donetsk
 Ionuț Mazilu – Dnipro Dnipropetrovsk, Arsenal Kyiv
 Florinel Mirea – Stal Alchevsk
 Marius Mitu – Metalurh Donetsk – 2006–07
 Adrian Neaga – Volyn Lutsk
 Marius Niculae – Hoverla Uzhhorod
 Cristian Oroș – Hoverla Uzhhorod
 Florin Pârvu – Stal Alchevsk
 Ionel Pârvu – Metalurh Zaporizhzhia, Tavriya Simferopol
 Sorin Paraschiv – Volyn Lutsk
 Răzvan Raț – Shakhtar Donetsk
 Marian Savu – Shakhtar Donetsk, Metalurh Donetsk
 Constantin Schumacher – Volyn Lutsk
 Flavius Stoican – Shakhtar Donetsk, Metalist Kharkiv
 Florin Șoavă – Arsenal Kyiv
 Ciprian Tănasă – Metalurh Donetsk
 Alexandru Tudose – Hoverla Uzhhorod
 Ciprian Vasilache – Vorskla Poltava
 Alexandru Vlad – Dnipro Dnipropetrovsk

Russia  
 Magomed Adiev – Kryvbas Kryvyi Rih
 Guram Adzhoyev – Metalist Kharkiv – 1992–93
 Eduard Akbarov – Nyva Vinnytsia
 Andrey Aleksanenkov – Dynamo Kyiv, Mykolaiv – 1992–93, 1994–95
 Maksim Aristarkhov – Arsenal Kyiv, Metalurh Zaporizhzhia, Zorya Luhansk
 Erik Ashurbekov – Metalist Kharkiv
 Aleksei Bakharev – Shakhtar Donetsk
 Vyacheslav Bakharev – Chornomorets Odesa
 Sergei Barkalov – Kremin Kremenchuk
 Lev Berezner – Bukovyna Chernivtsi
 Sergei Bespalykh – Dnipro Dnipropetrovsk, Prykarpattya Ivano-Frankivsk
 Sergei Bozhko – Zorya Luhansk, Stal Alchevsk
 Aleksandr Danishevsky – Arsenal Kyiv
 Andriy Demchenko – Metalurh Zaporizhzhia – 1998–07, 2009–10
 Maksim Demenko – Dynamo Kyiv
 Andrey Eshchenko – Dynamo Kyiv, Dnipro Dnipropetrovsk, Arsenal Kyiv
 Andrei Fedkov – Kremin Kremenchuk, Shakhtar Donetsk
 Aleksandr Filimonov – Dynamo Kyiv – 2001
 Vadim Firsov – Zirka Kirovohrad
 Andrei Gashkin – Nyva Ternopil, Chornomorets Odesa
 Yuri Gatilov – Volyn Lutsk
 Aleksei Gerasimenko – Dynamo Kyiv
 Yuri Getikov – Tavriya Simferopol, Temp Shepetivka – 1992–93, 1994–95
 Valeri Gitya-Petrinsky – Nyva Vinnytsia, Tavriya Simferopol
 Sergei Gladyshev – Tavriya Simferopol – 1992
 Aleksandr Gorin – Kryvbas Kryvyi Rih
 Aleksandr Gorshkov – Nyva Vinnytsia, Chornomorets Odesa
 Vitali Grishin – Vorskla Poltava
 Dmitri Gulenkov – Tavriya Simferopol – 1992–93
 Rolan Gusev – Dnipro Dnipropetrovsk, Arsenal Kyiv
 Aleksei Igonin – Chornomorets Odesa
 Aleksei Ilyin – Veres Rivne
 Konstantin Kamnev – Chornomorets Odesa
 Andrei Karyaka – Metalurh Zaporizhzhia, CSKA Kyiv
 Dmitri Korneev – Veres Rivne
 Sergei Kosilov – Tavriya Simferopol
 Anatoli Kretov – Naftovyk-Ukrnafta Okhtyrka
 Stanislav Kriulin – Kryvbas Kryvyi Rih
 Sergei Kryuchikhin – Arsenal Kyiv
 German Kutarba – Arsenal Kyiv, Metalurh Zaporizhzhia, Tavriya Simferopol
 Vladimir Kuzmichyov – Dynamo Kyiv
 Nikolay Kuznetsov – Temp Shepetivka
 Vladimir Lebed – Dnipro Dnipropetrovsk, Chornomorets Odesa – 1992–94
 Sergei Lysenko – Chornomorets Odesa
 Marat Makhmutov – Chornomorets Odesa
 Aleksandr Malygin – Zorya Luhansk, Illichivets Mariupol, Zakarpattia Uzhhorod
 Sergei Mamchur – Dnipro Dnipropetrovsk – 1992–93
 Ramiz Mamedov – Dynamo Kyiv
 Vitali Markov – Bukovyna Chernivtsi
 Vladislav Mayorov – Kryvbas Kryvyi Rih
 Oleg Mekhov – Veres Rivne
 Eduard Mor – Volyn Lutsk
 Marat Mulashev – Tavriya Simferopol – 1992
 Valentin Nefyodov – Chornomorets Odesa, Naftovyk-Ukrnafta Okhtyrka, Illichivets Mariupol
 Yuriy Nikiforov – Chornomorets Odesa – 1992–93
 Gennadiy Nizhegorodov – Chornomorets Odesa
 Vladislav Novikov – Tavriya Simferopol
 Karen Oganyan – Metalist Kharkiv
 Aleksandr Orekhov – Arsenal Kyiv
 Sergei Osipov – Chornomorets Odesa
 Valeri Panchik – Metalist Kharkiv
 Andrei Panfyorov – Kryvbas Kryvyi Rih
 Oleg Petrov – Veres Rivne – 1992–93
 Yuri Petrov – Mykolaiv, Volyn Lutsk, Metalist Kharkiv
 Andrei Pletnyov – Zorya Luhansk
 Sergei Polstyanov – Nyva Ternopil, Tavriya Simferopol
 Aleksandr Ponomaryov – Chornomorets Odesa
 Sergei Pravkin – Kryvbas Kryvyi Rih
 Sergei Prikhodko – Chornomorets Odesa
 Murad Ramazanov – Kryvbas Kryvyi Rih
 Sergei Ryzhikh – Metalist Kharkiv, Zakarpattia Uzhhorod
 Oleg Salenko – Dynamo Kyiv – 1992
 Sergey Samodin – Dnipro Dnipropetrovsk, Arsenal Kyiv
 Yevgeni Saprykin – Metalurh Zaporizhzhia
 Eduard Sarkisov – Prykarpattya Ivano-Frankivsk
 Aleksei Savelyev – Vorskla Poltava
 Valeri Shevyrev – Metalurh Zaporizhzhia
 Aleksandr Shmarko – Shakhtar Donetsk
 Sergei Shumilin – Kryvbas Kryvyi Rih
 Oleg Simakov – Kryvbas Kryvyi Rih
 Anatoli Skvortsov – Tavriya Simferopol
 Dmitri Smirnov – Tavriya Simferopol – 1992
 Aleksei Snigiryov – Veres Rivne
 Yuri Sobol – Vorskla Poltava, Kremin Kremenchuk
 Andrei Solomatin – Obolon Kyiv
 Aleksandr Sonin – Arsenal Kyiv
 Igor Strelkov – Shakhtar Donetsk
 Ruslan Suanov – Metalurh Zaporizhzhia
 Sergei Sukhoruchenkov – Kryvbas Kryvyi Rih, Chornomorets Odesa
 Vladislav Ternavsky – Nyva Ternopil, Chornomorets Odesa
 Valeri Tkachuk – Torpedo Zaporizhzhia, Metalurh Zaporizhzhia
 Sergei Tkachyov – Metalist Kharkiv
 Dmitri Travin – Temp Shepetivka
 Sergei Troitskiy – Kremin Kremenchuk
 Akhrik Tsveiba – Dynamo Kyiv – 1992–93
 Ilya Tsymbalar – Chornomorets Odesa – 1992–93
 Aleksei Uvarov – Chornomorets Odesa, Arsenal Kyiv
 Kirill Varaksin – Metalurh Zaporizhzhia
 Yevgeni Varlamov – Metalist Kharkiv – 2004–06
 Sergei Vasilyev – Metalist Kharkiv
 Vyaczeslav Vishnevskiy – Tavriya Simferopol
 Roman Yemelyanov – Zorya Luhansk
 Valery Yesipov – Dynamo Kyiv – 1992
 Roman Yevmenyev – Zirka Kirovohrad
 Aleksandr Zarutskiy – Tavriya Simferopol
 Vladimir Zinich – Torpedo Zaporizhzhia

Senegal  
 Mamadou Danfa – Kolos Kovalivka – 2019–22
 Pape Diakhaté – Dynamo Kyiv – 2007–10, 2011–12
 Matar Dieye – Olimpik Donetsk, Karpaty Lviv – 2018–20 
 Papa Gueye – Volyn Lutsk, Metalist Kharkiv, Dnipro Dnipropetrovsk, Karpaty Lviv, Dnipro-1 – 2005–16, 2018–20
 Assane N'Diaye – Shakhtar Donetsk – 
 Issa Ndoye – Volyn Lutsk – 
 Demba Touré – Dynamo Kyiv – 2006–07

Serbia  
 Miodrag Anđelković – Metalurh Zaporizhzhia
 Branko Ašković – Kryvbas Kryvyi Rih
 Branko Baković – Naftovyk-Ukrnafta Okhtyrka
 Ilija Borenović – Kryvbas Kryvyi Rih
 Siniša Branković – Chornomorets Odesa
 Aleksandar Brđanin – Metalurh Zaporizhzhia
 Mirko Bunjevčević – Arsenal Kyiv, Zorya Luhansk
 Mihajlo Cakić – Zorya Luhansk
 Saša Cilinšek – Tavriya Simferopol
 Goran Ćosić – Kryvbas Kryvyi Rih
 Marko Dević – Volyn Lutsk, Metalist Kharkiv – 2005–08 ( while active)
 Vladimir Dišljenković – Metalurh Donetsk, Metalist Kharkiv – 2005–10 ( while active)
 Igor Duljaj – Shakhtar Donetsk, Sevastopol
 Darko Dunjić – Kryvbas Kryvyi Rih, Zorya Luhansk
 Igor Đinović – Vorskla Poltava, Kryvbas Kryvyi Rih
 Slavoljub Đorđević – Volyn Lutsk, Kryvbas Kryvyi Rih
 Goran Gavrančić – Dynamo Kyiv
 Marko Grubelić – Metalurh Donetsk, Stal Alchevsk
 Miroslav Grumić – Vorskla Poltava
 Ivan Gvozdenović – Metalurh Donetsk
 Ivica Janićijević – Karpaty Lviv
 Marko Jovanović – Chornomorets Odesa – 2007–08
 Milan Jovanović – Shakhtar Donetsk – 2002–03 ( while active)
 Damir Kahriman – Tavriya Simferopol
 Nenad Lalatović – Shakhtar Donetsk
 Đorđe Lazić – Metalurh Donetsk
 Željko Ljubenović – Kryvbas Kryvyi Rih, Tavriya Simferopol
 Jovan Markoski – Vorskla Poltava
 Marjan Marković – Dynamo Kyiv
 Slobodan Marković – Metalurh Donetsk, Tavriya Simferopol – 2004–05, 2007–11 ( while active)
 Vladimir Mićović – Tavriya Simferopol
 Vladimir Milenković – Vorskla Poltava
 Uroš Milosavljević – Metalurh Zaporizhzhia, Volyn Lutsk
 Ivan Milošević – Karpaty Lviv
 Marko Milovanović – Tavriya Simferopol
 Saša Mitić – Volyn Lutsk – 2004–05 ( while active)
 Nenad Mladenović – Metalurh Donetsk
 Miljan Mrdaković – Metalist Kharkiv
 Bojan Neziri – Metalurh Donetsk – 2003–05, 2006–07 ( while active)
 Miloš Ninković – Dynamo Kyiv – 2004–13 ( while active)
 Milan Obradović – Metalist Kharkiv
 Predrag Ocokoljić – Shakhtar Donetsk
 Perica Ognjenović – Dynamo Kyiv
 Aleksandar Pantić – Dynamo Kyiv – 2017
 Ivan Perić – Arsenal Kyiv
 Dragan Perišić – Metalurh Zaporizhzhia
 Igor Petković – Vorskla Poltava, Zorya Luhansk
 Dušan Popović – Volyn Lutsk
 Minja Popović – Zakarpattia Uzhhorod
 Stevan Račić – Volyn Lutsk
 Ljubiša Ranković – Metalurh Zaporizhzhia
 Vladimir Ribić – Arsenal Kyiv
 Miroslav Rikanović – Zorya Luhansk
 Bratislav Ristić – Metalurh Donetsk – 2003–06, 2007 ( while active)
 Sead Salahović – Kryvbas Kryvyi Rih
 Vladimir Sandulović – Vorskla Poltava
 Miloš Stamenković – Stal Kamianske, Rukh Lviv – 2016–17, 2020–
 Saša Stević – Volyn Lutsk
 Aleksandar Stoimirović – Vorskla Poltava
 Ilija Stolica – Metalurh Donetsk – 2003–04 ( while active)
 Dušan Šimić – Karpaty Lviv
 Vučina Šćepanović – Kryvbas Kryvyi Rih
 Saša Todić – Tavriya Simferopol
 Rade Todorović – Kryvbas Kryvyi Rih – 2004–05 ( while active)
 Aleksandar Trišović – Volyn Lutsk, Kryvbas Kryvyi Rih, Metalist Kharkiv, Chornomorets Odesa, Hoverla Uzhhorod – 2004–06, 2008–10, 2012–13 ( while active)
 Nemanja Tubić – Karpaty Lviv
 Aco Vasiljević – Metalurh Zaporizhzhia
 Nikola Vasiljević – Metalurh Zaporizhzhia
 Zvonimir Vukić – Shakhtar Donetsk
 Milan Zagorac – Kryvbas Kryvyi Rih

Slovakia  
 Marián Adam – Metalist Kharkiv
 Tomáš Bruško – Vorskla Poltava
 František Hanc – Karpaty Lviv
 Ján Maslo – Volyn Lutsk – 2011–14 
 Peter Sukovský – Karpaty Lviv
 Lukáš Štetina – Metalist Kharkiv
 Lukáš Tešák – Zorya Luhansk
 Ján Zolna – Metalurh Zaporizhzhia, Volyn Lutsk

Slovenia  
 Gregor Balažic – Karpaty Lviv – 2011–14
 Rusmin Dedič – Vorskla Poltava – 2003–04
 Erik Gliha – Rukh Lviv – 2020–2021
 Miha Goropevšek – Volyn Lutsk – 2015–17 
 Darijan Matič – Kryvbas Kryvyi Rih – 2011–13
 Zoran Pavlovič – Vorskla Poltava
 Matija Rom – Kolos Kovalivka – 2020–
 Dalibor Stevanović – Volyn Lutsk – 2011–12 
 Almir Sulejmanovič – Zorya Luhansk
 Senad Tiganj – Karpaty Lviv
 Muamer Vugdalič – Shakhtar Donetsk – 2001
 Benjamin Verbič – Dynamo Kyiv – 2017–22
 David Zec – Rukh Lviv – 2020–21

South Africa  
 Tercious Malepe – Mynai – 2020–21

Spain  
 Mario Arqués – Karpaty Lviv – 2017
 Marc Castells – Zirka Kropyvnytskyi – 2017
 Amilcar Codjovi – Vorskla Poltava – 2021–
 Borja Ekiza – Zirka Kropyvnytskyi – 2016–17
 Aitor Fernández – Zirka Kropyvnytskyi – 2016
 Dani Fernández – Metalurh Donetsk – 2006–07
 Borja Gómez – Karpaty Lviv – 2011
 Jordi López – Hoverla Uzhhorod – 2012–13
 Cristóbal Márquez – Karpaty Lviv – 2011
 Lucas Pérez – Karpaty Lviv – 2011–12
 Sito Riera – Chornomorets Odesa – 2012–13
 Fran Sol – Dynamo Kyiv – 2018–21

Sweden  
 Gustav Svensson – Tavriya Simferopol – 2012–13

Switzerland  
 Admir Mehmedi – Dynamo Kyiv – 2012–13
 Griffin Sabatini – Dnipro-1 – 2020
 Danijel Subotić – Volyn Lutsk – 2012–13

Tajikistan  
 Arsen Avakov – Temp Shepetivka, Torpedo Zaporizhzhia
 Vitaliy Levchenko – CSKA Kyiv, Tavriya Simferopol
 Vitaliy Parakhnevych – Nyva Ternopil, Odesa, Chornomorets Odesa

Tanzania  
 Yohana Mkomola – Inhulets Petrove – 2020–21

Togo  
 Serge Akakpo – Hoverla Uzhhorod, Arsenal Kyiv – 2013–15, 2018–19
 Abbe Ibrahim – Kharkiv – 2007–08
 Prince Segbefia – Zorya Luhansk – 2014–15

Tunisia  
 Mohamed Larbi Arouri – Metalurh Zaporizhzhia
 Mohamed Ali Ben Salem – Inhulets Petrove – 2021– 
 Aymen Bouchhioua – Zorya Luhansk
 Anis Boussaidi – Metalurh Donetsk, Arsenal Kyiv
 Ameur Derbal – Kharkiv
 Mohamed Achraf Khalfaoui – Metalurh Zaporizhzhia
 Sofiane Melliti – Vorskla Poltava
 Toafik Salhi – Zorya Luhansk, Sevastopol

Turkey  
 Erol Bulut – Metalurh Donetsk – 2007–08
 Tolga Seyhan – Shakhtar Donetsk –

Turkmenistan  
 Dmitri Khomukha – Metalist Kharkiv – 1992–94
 Aleksandr Menshikov – Temp Shepetivka 1994-95
 Andriy Khomyn – Prykarpattya Ivano-Frankivsk, Dynamo Kyiv, Vorskla Poltava 1992–2000
 Roman Bondarenko – Torpedo Zaporizhzhia, Metalurh Zaporizhzhia – 1992–98, 1999–2000
 Konstantin Sosenko – Nyva Vinnytsia, Dnipro Dnipropetrovsk, CSKA Kyiv, Prykarpattya Ivano-Frankivsk 1995-2000
 Yuri Magdiýew – Nyva Ternopil 1999-2000
 Muslim Agaýew – Nyva Ternopil 1999-2000
 Igor Kislov – Vorskla Poltava, Zirka Kropyvnytskyi, Tavriya Simferopol 1996-2001
 Andrei Zavyalov – Dynamo Kyiv, Nyva Vinnytsia, Metalurh Donetsk, Kryvbas Kryvyi Rih, Oleksandriya 1992-2002
 Serhiy Chuichenko – Vorskla Poltava, Metalist Kharkiv, Oleksandriya 1998, 2001-03
 Omar Berdiýew – Metalist Kharkiv 2003
 Didargylyç Urazow – Metalist Kharkiv 2003
 Nazar Baýramow – Vorskla Poltava 2002-04
 Rasim Kerimov – Vorskla Poltava 2002-04
 Guwançmuhammet Öwekow – Arsenal Kyiv, Vorskla Poltava, Zorya Luhansk, Kharkiv (2001-2004, 2006-2008)

Uganda  
 Melvyn Lorenzen – Karpaty Lviv – 2019

United States  
 Dema Kovalenko – Metalurh Zaporizhzhia – 2006 
 Eugene Starikov – Chornomorets Odesa – 2015–16

Uruguay  
 Alejandro Mello – Chornomorets Odesa – 2007–10
 Carlos de Pena – Dynamo Kyiv – 2019–
 Sebastián Ribas – Karpaty Lviv – 2017 
 Damián Rodríguez – Shakhtar Donetsk – 2002–03
 Sebastián Vázquez – Chornomorets Odesa – 2007–10

Uzbekistan  
 Sergey Andreev – Tavriya Simferopol – 1992–93
 Oleg Belyakov – Kryvbas Kryvyi Rih – 2002–03
 Vitaliy Denisov – Dnipro Dnipropetrovsk – 2006–13
 Sadriddin Ishmirzaev – Tavriya Simferopol – 1992–93
 Jafar Irismetov – Kryvbas Kryvyi Rih – 2003–04
 Anvar Jabbarov – Kryvbas Kryvyi Rih – 1992–93
 Aleksandr Khvostunov – Chornomorets Odesa, Zakarpattia Uzhhorod – 2002–05
 Gennadiy Sharipov – Zorya Luhansk – 1992–93
 Maksim Shatskikh – Dynamo Kyiv, Arsenal Kyiv, Chornomorets Odesa, Hoverla Uzhhorod – 1999–2008, 2010–15
 Sergey Smorodin – Chornomorets Odesa – 2017
 Sanzhar Tursunov – Vorskla Poltava 2013–16
 Ruslan Uzakov – Torpedo Zaporizhzhia, Shakhtar Donetsk – 1992–94

Venezuela  
 Eric Ramírez – Dynamo Kyiv – 2021–22

Zambia  
 Shemmy Mayembe – Mynai – 2020–21

Zimbabwe  
 Henry Mutambikwa – Karpaty Lviv – 2001–02
 Musawengosi Mguni – Metalurh Donetsk – 2009–14

See also 
 Foreign footballers in Vyscha Liha listed by club

References

External sources 
  Career stats by FFU
  List of players in Premier-Liha
  Career history at National Football Teams

Notes

 

Ukraine

foreign
Association football player non-biographical articles